Elisa Lucinda (born February 2, 1958) is a Brazilian actress, singer, poet, writer and journalist. Born in Cariacica, Espírito Santo, she studied poetry between the age of 11 and 17. Lucinda attended journalism school at Vitória, when she worked writing for newspapers and in a news program. Lucinda was 27 when she decided to move to Rio de Janeiro to become an actress; however, her poetry was more successful. After selling poems and hand-written books, she attracted attention from stage and television directors, debuting on Rede Manchete's telenovela Kananga do Japão in 1989.

Work 
The poet Elisa Lucinda talks about love, pain, passion, frustration, birth, death; these universal themes that accompany the despair and hope of us all. But her poetry doesn’t shy away from dealing with social problems that are quite Brazilian. Racism, sexism, mistreatment of the poor.

Selected filmography
 Kananga do Japão (1989)
 Que sera, sera (2002)
 Mulheres Apaixonadas (2003)
 Páginas da Vida (2006)
 The Last Stop (2012)
 Manhãs de Setembro (2021)

References

External links

1958 births
20th-century Brazilian actresses
Brazilian journalists
20th-century Brazilian poets
20th-century Brazilian women singers
20th-century Brazilian singers
20th-century Brazilian women writers
People from Espírito Santo
Living people
Brazilian women poets